Leptocypris modestus is a species of cyprinid fish found in Congo River in the Democratic Republic of Congo and the Central African Republic. It is the type species of the genus Leptocypris.

References

Leptocypris
Danios
Fish of Africa
Fish described in 1900